Lucia Medzihradská (born 14 November 1968, in Brezno) is a Slovak former alpine skier who competed for Czechoslovakia in the 1988 Winter Olympics, 1992 Winter Olympics, and 1994 Winter Olympics. She studied Theory of Culture and Fine Art and is a photographer, graphic designer and creates artwork using digital and mixed media. She is also an artist with works on display with the Art of the Olympians.

References

External links
 

1968 births
Sportspeople from Brezno
Living people
Slovak female alpine skiers
Czechoslovak female alpine skiers
Olympic alpine skiers of Czechoslovakia
Olympic alpine skiers of Slovakia
Alpine skiers at the 1988 Winter Olympics
Alpine skiers at the 1992 Winter Olympics
Alpine skiers at the 1994 Winter Olympics